Spirit World Field Guide is the eighth studio album by American hip hop artist Aesop Rock. It was released on November 13, 2020, through Rhymesayers Entertainment. It acts as a "guide" to  the Spirit World. The album was preceded by two singles: "The Gates" released on September 9, and "Pizza Alley" released on October 16, 2020. Both were released with music videos directed by Rob Shaw and featuring animation from Justin "Coro" Kaufman, who also designed the album's cover art. A third single and music video, "Coveralls", was released on November 13 alongside the album.

The album was first teased following a series of cryptic Instagram posts. Supporting its "survival guide" theme, the album was available on Rhymesayers Entertainment's official website as a preorder along with items such as a canteen, a pocket knife, and a flint kit being sold. The album peaked at number 54 on the Billboard 200.

Background and composition

Spirit World Field Guide is a concept album following a narrator through an alternate world, including "hallucinatory images of killer eels, magic spells, and people on the run" and "anecdotes, recipes, survival tips, warnings, maps, [and] drawings".

Following his 2019 collaborative album Malibu Ken with electronic musician Tobacco, Aesop took a break from touring and considered quitting music entirely. He traveled to Peru with bassist James Lynch, which reinvigorated his passion to write songs. This trip produced "Pizza Alley", the first song written for the album. Crediting "the act of being somewhere else" as his source of inspiration, Aesop continued traveling and visited Cambodia and Thailand, which served as inspiration for "Holy Waterfall" and "Sleeper Car", respectively. "Hello from the Spirit World", the spoken-word intro of the album, was the final song recorded, with Aesop originally considering it for a promotional announcement.

Musically, the album's production includes a "mix of electric guitar, laser synths, and crisp drums", while taking inspiration from boom bap, funk, progressive rock, and psychedelic rock.

Release and promotion
In September 2020, Aesop Rock released a music video for "The Gates" directed by Rob Shaw and starring Shaw's children. The video combined live-action footage with animation from Justin "Coro" Kaufman, who also designed the album's cover art. The video was accompanied by an announcement of the album's release date of November 13, 2020, title Spirit World Field Guide, and 21-song track listing. Aesop considered the song "at least a little catchy", and credited it as a breakthrough moment for the project. The next month, he released a second music video for "Pizza Alley", also directed by Shaw and featuring animation from Kaufman. The album was released on November 13, 2020, alongside a third Shaw-directed music video for "Coveralls".

Reception

Critical response

In a positive review, Pitchfork Stephen Kearse praised Aesop Rock's "vivid and imagistic" rapping and lyricism that "brims with wonder". Kearse considered the album's production "the best of [Aesop's] career" while specifically highlighting "Gauze" and "Crystal Sword", and considered Spirit World Field Guide to be "the most joyous album [Aesop Rock] has ever made". Tom Breihan of Stereogum referred to the album as "an exploration of one man's crippling dread" with "dense and layered" lyrics, praising the "warm and lush and genuinely funky" sound of Aesop's production. He concluded that Spirit World Field Guide "an album that sounds and works like nothing else", and later ranked it as the ninth-best rap album of 2020.

Commercial performance
Spirit World Field Guide debuted on the Billboard 200 at number 54, his fourth-highest-charting album. Additionally, it placed on Billboard Top R&B/Hip-Hop Albums and Independent Albums charts, among others.

Track listing

Personnel
Credits adapted from the album's liner notes.

 Aesop Rock – producer , additional producer , executive producer
 Heidi Hopfer – additional vocals 
 Grimace Federation – additional instrumentation 
 Hanni El Khatib – additional instrumentation , producer 
 James Lynch – bass 
 Homeboy Sandman – additional vocals 
 DJ Zone – scratches 
 Leon Michels – producer 
 Joey Raia – mixing
 Joe LaPorta – mastering
 Kevin Frias – engineering assistance
 Justin "Coro" Kaufman – art, layout
 Alex Everson – project coordinator
 Jessica Daley – project coordinator
 Kevin Beacham – project coordinator
 Brent Sayers – executive producer 
 Sean Daley – executive producer

Charts

References

2020 albums
Aesop Rock albums
Albums produced by Aesop Rock
Hip hop albums by American artists
Rhymesayers Entertainment albums